Bima (Indonesia: Kota Bima) is a city on the eastern coast of the island of Sumbawa in central Indonesia's province West Nusa Tenggara. It is the largest city on the island of Sumbawa, with a population of 142,443 at the 2010 census and 155,140 at the 2020 census; the official estimate as at mid 2021 was 156,224. It is separate from (but surrounded on the landward side by) the adjoining Regency of Bima which had a population of 520,444 according to the mid 2021 official estimates..

The people of Bima and the entire eastern side of Sumbawa speak what is known as Bima language (Indonesia: Bahasa Bima ; Bima: Nggahi Mbojo). From 1620 to 1958 it was the capital of the Bima Sultanate. In modern times, Bima is the largest regional and economic hub of Eastern Sumbawa with transmigrants from other parts of Indonesia, especially Java, Bali, and Lombok. It has a central downtown commercial zone. It is home to the Sultan Salahuddin mosque and the Sultan Salahuddin museum (former Bima Sultanate palace). It is connected by provincial road to Dompu and Sape.

Administrative districts 
Bima city consists of five districts (kecamatan), tabulated below with their areas and their populations at the 2010 census and the 2020 census, together with the official estimates as at mid 2021.

Geography
The city is located on the eastern shore of Bima Bay. Traditionally Bima was a port city that connected to other port cities in Eastern Indonesia such as Makassar and Ternate, as well as to ports in Lombok, Bali, and East Java.

Climate
Bima has a tropical savanna climate (Köppen Aw) with moderate to little rainfall from April to November and heavy rainfall from December to March.

Demography
Bima, based on data for 2000, had a population of 116,295 – comprising 57,108 male (49%) and 59,187 female (51%).  There is uneven population distribution, with the densest population concentrated in the centers of economic activity and governance. The largest population was in the village of Paruga, which amounted to 12,275 people (11%) and the least was in the village of Kendo, with 1130 souls (1%).  At the population census of 2010, the population in Bima numbered 142,443 – 69,841 men and 72,602 women, and at the population census of 2020, the population in Bima numbered 155,140 – 77,009 men and 78,131 women.

The majority of the populace in Bima are Muslims, who form about 97.38%, and the rest are Protestant 0.89%, Catholic Christians 0.62%, and Hindus and Buddhists around 1.11%.

Transportation
Bima is connected through trans Sumbawa road to Sape harbour in the east and Dompu in Southwest all the way to Sumbawa Besar and Taliwang in the western part of Sumbawa. Bus services connected Bima to other neighboring cities in Sumbawa as far as Mataram in Lombok are available. Air transportation is served through Sultan Salahuddin Airport in southern outskirt of Bima by NAM Air and Wings Air to Lombok, Denpasar and Makassar. Bima was also a stop on Qantas Airways' pre-war route between Sydney and Singapore, serviced by C Class Empire flying boats.

History
Bima was once one of the four sultanates on the island of Sumbawa. From the 17th to 20th centuries, it was the capital of the Bima Sultanate and is home to an old palace of the city's rulers. In the early 17th century, the Islamization of Bima had fallen off the old Hindu kingdom on the east coast of the island of Sumbawa.

In 1792, Sultan Abdu'l Hamid Muhammad Shah signed a contract with the Dutch East India Company, through which Bima became the Protectorate of the Dutch..

Tourism

Bima has several well-known tourist destinations, such as Mount Tambora, Wawo traditional Village, Sambori traditional village, Snake Island, Ana fari Lake (Lake of the angels) and Satonda Island. There are many white sandy beaches both in the northern and southern parts of Bima. The city has modest tourist accommodations, such as 1-star hotels and some restaurants. Its main attractions are the Sultan Salahuddin mosque, the Terapung mosque and Sultan Salahuddin museum (former Bima Sultanate palace). Bima airport serves as the air-hub for domestic and foreign visitors, who are more attracted to visit Hu'u beach for surfing or Tambora volcano for hiking.

Sister cities

 Alor Setar, Malaysia

References

Further reading 
 Anthony Reid, The rise of Makassar. Review of Indonesian and Malaysian Affairs 17:117-160, 1983. 
 Anthony Reid, Pluralism and progress in seventeenth century Makassar. Paper presented at the Leiden workshop “Trade, society and belief in South Sulawesi”. MS, 1987. 
 A. Ligtvoet, "Transcriptie van de Lontara-Bilang of het Dagboek der Vorsten van Gowa en Tello", Bijdragen tot de Taal-, Land- en Volkenkunde van Nederlandsch-Indië, Vierde Volgreeks, Vierde Deel - 1e stuk. Koninklijk Instituut voor Taal-, Land- en Volkenkunde, The Hague, 1880. pages 1–259.
 D.F.van Braam Morris, "Nota van toelichting behoorende bij het contract gesloten met het Landschap Bima op den 20sten October 1886". Tijdschrift voor Indische Taal-, Land- en Volkenkunde uitgegeven door het Bataviaasch Genootschap van Kunsten en Wetenschappen. Deel XXXIV, pp. 176–233. Batavia, 1891.
 Henri Chambert-Loir. Ceritera Asal Bangsa Jin dan Segala Dewa-Dewa, Ecole française d'Extrême-Orient, Bandung, Angkasa, 1985.
 Henri Chambert-Loir and Siti Maryam R. Salahuddin, Bo' Sangaji Kai: Catatan Kerajaan Bima. Ecole française d'Extrême-Orient/Yayasan Obor Indonesia, Jakarta, 1999.
 Dr S.W.R. Mulyadi and H.Siti Maryam R. Salahuddin, SH. Bandar Bima. Departemen Pendidikan dan Kebudayaan ..., 1993.
 Dr S.W.R. Mulyadi and H.Siti Maryam R. Salahuddin, SH. Katalogus Naskah Melayu Bima. Yayasan Museum Kepudayaan "Samparaja" Bima, 1990.
 J. Noorduyn, Bima en Sumbawa: Bijdragen tot de geschiedenis van de sultanen Bima en Sumbawa door A. Ligtvoet en G.P. Rouffaer. Foris Publications, Dordrecht-Holland, 1987.
 J. Noorduyn, "Makasar and the Islamization of Bima". Bijdragen tot de Taal-, Land- en Volkenkunde van Nederlandsch-Indië. Uitgegeven door het Koninklijk Instituut voor Taal-, Land- en Volkenkunde, part 143, pp. 312–342.
 Leonard Y Andaya, The heritage of Arung Palakka. A history of South Sulawesi (Celebes) in the seventeenth century. The Hague: Martinus Nijhoff, 1981. 
 Michael Hitchcock, Islam and Identity in Eastern Indonesia. University of Hull Press, 1996.
 Muhammad Adlin Sila, "Momentum Hari Jadi ke 372 Bima: Meempertegas Identitas Islam Dou Labo Dana Mbojo." Wednesday, 11 July 2012 (www.bimakini.com).
 Muhammad Adlin Sila, "Asi dan BO Mbojo: Refleksi Integritas Dou Labo Dana Mbojo." Tuesday, 17 July 2012 (www.bimakini.com).
 Muhammad Adlin Sila, "Peranan Kesultanan Bima dalam Sejarah Pendidikan di Bima." Saturday, 12 May 2012 (www.bimakini.com).
 F. David Bulbeck, "The Politics of Marriage and the Marriage of Polities in Gowa, South Sulawesi, During the 16th and 17th Centuries".In Peter Bellwood, James J. Fox and Darrell Tryon (eds) The Austronesians: historical and comparative perspectives, pp. 214–228. Canberra: Research School of Pacific and Asian Studies, The Australian National University, 1995. 
 M. Hilir Ismail, Peran Kesultanan Bima Dalam Perjalanan Sejarah Nusantara. Mataram, Nusa Tenggara Barat: Penerbit Lengge, 2004.
 M. Hilir Ismail, Kebangkitan Islam di Dana Mbojo (Bima) (1540-1950). Bogor, Indonesia: Penerbit CV Binasti, 2008.
 Abdurrazak daeng Patunru, Sedjarah Goa. Jajasan Kebudajaen Sulawesi Selatan dan Tenggara, Makassar, 1967.
 Michael Prager. 2010. ABANDONING THE 'GARDEN OF MAGIC' : Islamic modernism and contested spirit assertions in Bima. Indonesia and the Malay World, Volume 38, Issue 110 March 2010, pages 9 – 25.
 Peter Just. 2000. Dou Donggo Justice: Conflict and Morality in an Indonesian Society. Rowman & Littlefield.

External links
 
 Bima Wordlist at the Austronesian Basic Vocabulary Database
 Hägerdal, Hans (2017), Held's History of Sumbawa. Amsterdam: Amsterdam University Press.

Populated places in West Nusa Tenggara
Cities in Indonesia